Bruno Dumont (born 14 March 1958) is a French film director and screenwriter. To date, he has directed ten feature films, all of which border somewhere between realistic drama and the avant-garde. His films have won several awards at the Cannes Film Festival. Two of Dumont's films have won the Grand Prix award: both L'Humanité (1999) and Flandres (2006). Dumont's Hadewijch won the 2009 Prize of the International Critics (FIPRESCI Prize) for Special Presentation at the Toronto Film Festival.

Life and career
Dumont has a background of Greek and German (Western) philosophy, and of corporate video. His early films show the ugliness of extreme violence and provocative sexual behavior, and are usually classified as art films. Later films bring novel twists to other movie genres like comedy or musicals. Dumont has himself likened his films to visual arts, and he typically uses long takes, close-ups of people's bodies, and story lines involving extreme emotions. Dumont does not write traditional scripts for his films. Instead, he writes complete novels which are then the basis for his filmmaking.

He says that some of his favorite filmmakers are Stanley Kubrick, Ingmar Bergman, Pier Paolo Pasolini, Roberto Rossellini, and Abbas Kiarostami. He is frequently considered an artistic heir to Robert Bresson.

His often polarizing work has been connected to a recent French cinéma du corps/body of cinema, encompassing contemporary films by Claire Denis, Marina de Van, Gaspar Noé, Diane Bertrand, and François Ozon, among others. According to Tim Palmer, this trajectory includes a focus on states of corporeality in and of themselves, independent of narrative exposition or character psychology. In a more pejorative vein, James Quandt has also talked of some of this group of filmmakers, as the so-called New French Extremity.

His 2011 film Hors Satan premiered in the Un Certain Regard section at the 2011 Cannes Film Festival. His 2013 film Camille Claudel 1915 premiered in competition at the 63rd Berlin International Film Festival.

Dumont is an atheist.

Filmography

Feature films
 La vie de Jésus / The Life of Jesus (1997)
 Humanité / Humanity (1999)
 Twentynine Palms (2003)
 Flandres / Flanders (2006)
 Hadewijch (2009)
 Hors Satan (2011)
 Camille Claudel 1915 (2013)
 P'tit Quinquin / L'il Quinquin (2014)
 Slack Bay / Ma Loute (2016)
 Jeannette: The Childhood of Joan of Arc (2017)
 Coincoin and the Extra-Humans / Coincoin et les z'inhumains (2018)
  Joan of Arc / Jeanne (2019)
 France (2021)
 L'Empire (2023)

Short films
 Paris (1993)
 P'tit Quinquin / Li'l Quinquin (1993)
 Marie et Freddy / Marie and Freddy (1994)

Interviews and articles
 Kinok 14 September 2003
 Film de Culte (French)
 Village Voice 30 March 2004
 Cineuropa 23 May 2006
 Fluctuat 1 March 2012 (French)
 Premiere 28 August 2006 (French)
 Telerama 2 September 2006 (French)
 DVDrama 24 September 2006 (French)
 Film de Culte September 2006 (French)
 Photos of Bruno Dumont from The San Sebastian Film Festival, October 2009

References

External links
 Official site
 
 Flandres official site
 Twentynine Palms official site
 Masters of Cinema article

1958 births
Living people
European Film Awards winners (people)
French film directors
French atheists